Dino S. Andrade (born September 16, 1963) is an American voice actor in video games and animated projects. He manages dual careers as both a voice actor and the creator, owner and operator of the geek dating/community website SoulGeek.com.

Early life
Andrade was born to Mexican parents. He is the first-born son of José Roberto Andrade (1924–2000) and Gloria Esther (Mendez) Andrade (1924–1997). His father was serving in the United States Air Force at the time of Dino's birth. The family moved to McGuire Air Force Base in New Jersey where Dino spent the first five years of his life before his father left the armed services and the family returned to California. Andrade has one sister, Sabrina, born, six years later to the day, on September 16, 1969. He says that his love of all things science fiction, horror and fantasy is lifelong and in his blood. He has been quoted saying, "I was that guy in acting class that, while everyone was reading Mamet and O'Neill, I was reading Batman comics," thus attributing his love of animation and graphic storytelling to making his career in voice acting the natural choice for him.

Career
Andrade started as an actor on stage and doing comedy improvisation, having been trained at the Groundlings by the actors Mindy Sterling and Julia Sweeney. His official start in voice over work happened when he drove a friend and fellow actor to an audition to do some background looping on the 1985 feature film Girls Just Wanna Have Fun, starring the then unknowns Sarah Jessica Parker and Helen Hunt. He was asked if he would like to audition as well and was hired for the film. From this, he was recommended to the director Steve Miner who was doing post-production on the horror/comedy film House, starring William Katt, George Wendt and Richard Moll. Though not credited in the final release, Andrade was hired to do the creature sounds of the demons that kidnap a child that Katt's character has to rescue. He continued in voice acting and acting in general until the early 1990s when he left acting to pursue independent film making. Around 2002, Andrade returned to acting with a focus on voice acting training and has been in voice acting ever since.

Personal life
Andrade was married to the voice actress Mary Kay Bergman until her struggle with mental illness led to her suicide. Andrade has become active in raising mental health awareness and plans to launch the Mary Kay Bergman Project, a mental health outreach program for artists and entertainers. He has since remarried and they have one child.

Andrade has an interest in science fiction, horror, fantasy and animation. He was inspired to create SoulGeek.com, a geek dating and community website. The site was launched in July 2007.

Filmography

Voice roles

Video games
 World of Warcraft - Gelbin Mekkatorque, male Gnome NPCs
 World of Warcraft: The Burning Crusade - Gelbin Mekkatorque, Millhouse Manastorm
 World of Warcraft: Wrath of the Lich King - Gelbin Mekkatorque, Male Death Knight Gnome NPCs, Mimiron, Wilfred Fizzlebang, Krick, Professor Putricide
 World of Warcraft: Cataclysm - Gelbin Mekkatorque, Millhouse Manastorm, Fungalmancer Glop, Ensign Ebert, Twilight Servant
 World of Warcraft: Mists of Pandaria - Gelbin Mekkatorque, Amber-Shaper Un'sok, Xaril the Poisoned Mind
 World of Warcraft: Warlords of Draenor - Gelbin Mekkatorque
 World of Warcraft: Legion - Gelbin Mekkatorque, Millhouse Manastorm, Tinkmaster Overspark, Mimiron
 World of Warcraft: Battle for Azeroth - Gelbin Mekkatorque, Tinkmaster Overspark, Mimiron
 World of Warcraft: Shadowlands - Gelbin Mekkatorque, Millhouse Manastorm
 Sengoku Basara: Samurai Heroes (2010) - Kenshin Uesugi
 Brütal Legend (2009) - The Reaper & Hairbangers
 Batman: Arkham Asylum (2009) - The Scarecrow and various inmates
 Nerf N-Strike Elite (2009) - The Patrolbots
 Tales of Vesperia Xbox 360 (2008) - Ragou
 Guitar Hero: On Tour (2008)
 Call of Duty: Roads to Victory PSP (2007)
 Pocket God Fishmas Special (2010) - Klik
 Batman: Arkham Underworld IOS (2016) - The Scarecrow
 Prey (2017) - Kaspar
 Shenmue III (2019) - Additional Cast
 Trials of Mana (2020) - Death Eater
 Deadly Premonition 2: A Blessing in Disguise (2020) - Chuck Thompson

Animation
 Saint Tail (2001) (English dub)
 Ghost in the Shell: Stand Alone Complex (2002) (English dub)
 Wolf's Rain (2004) (English dub)
 Hellsing Ultimate -  Wild Geese (Ep. 3, 6), British Officers (Ep. 5), Helicopter Pilot (Ep. 8) (English dub)
 Revisioned: Tomb Raider (2007) Rodrigo, Moctezuma (Ep. "Revenge of the Aztec Mummy")
 Martin (2007) - Martin - pilot show
 Oishi High School Battle (2012) - Floating Butthole, Jerry, One Eyed Racist Squirrel
 PvP: The Series (2007) - Skull the Troll
 Ring Force Five (2008) - Morae - pilot show
 A Martian Christmas (2008) - Zork, Dwight (Credited as K.C.D. Shannon)
 The Five Senses (2011) - The Old Dude, The Bus Dude
 A Turtle's Tale 2: Sammy's Escape from Paradise (2012) - Manuel Hogfish
 Prince of Atlantis (2012) - Officer Sanchez/Chico
 Jingle and Bell's Christmas Star (2012) - Mover Guy 1
 Sofia the First (2015) - Flinch (Ep. "The Fliegel Has Landed")
 Shimmer and Shine (2015) - Male Elf (Ep. "Santa's Little Genies")
 New Looney Tunes (2018) - Speedy Gonzales
 Kamlu (in production)  - Mangli
 Mutafukaz (2017) - Willy (English Dub)
 Hanazuki: Full of Treasures (2018–present) - Enormous Coal
 The Last Prince of Atlantis (2018) - Dockworker, Young Deckhands
 The Queen's Corgi (2019) - Charlie, Pollux
 Playmobil: The Movie (2019) - Scurvy Pete
 Dia de Muertos (2019) - Julian
 El Camino de Xico (2021) - Tiacuache (English dub)
 Bidoof's Big Stand (2022) - Additional Bidoof
 Chickenhare and the Hamster of Darkness (2022) - Barry
 JoJo's Bizarre Adventure: Stone Ocean (2022) - Yo-Yo Ma (English dub)
 My Dad the Bounty Hunter (2023) - Karl

Other voice-overs
 Doing Life (1986) - Various inmates
 House (1986) - Voice of the Little Critters
 Great Family Getaways: Orlando (2008) - Narrator
 $#*! My Dad Says (2010) - Voice of Shatner at age 17
 2009: A True Story (2008) - Mayor of Los Angeles, Chief Network Executive
 Kevin Costner's The Explorer's Guild (2008) - Father Russeau (series villain)

Live-action
 The Trials of Rosie O'Neill (1990) - Actor
 Hulk Hogan's Rock 'n' Wrestling (1985) - Sketch comedian
 Girls Just Want to Have Fun (1985)
 Knights of the City (1986)
 Fast & Furious (2009) - Scratch

Production credits
 Bob's Video (1999) - writer, director and co-executive producer
 Pumpkin Man (1998) - writer

References

External links

Living people
American male voice actors
American male video game actors
20th-century American male actors
21st-century American male actors
Hispanic and Latino American male actors
American male actors of Mexican descent
1963 births